Tooele Army Depot (TEAD) is a United States Army Joint Munitions Command post in Tooele County, Utah.  It serves as a storage site for war reserve and training ammunition. The depot stores, issues, receives, renovates, modifies, maintains and demilitarizes conventional munitions. The depot also serves as the National Inventory Control Point for ammunition peculiar equipment, developing, fabricating,
modifying, storing and distributing such equipment to all services and other customers worldwide. TEAD provides base support to Deseret Chemical Depot.

Tooele Army Depot originally opened in 1942 during the early phase of U.S. involvement in World War II.  The workforce at the post is now primarily composed of civilians.  A full colonel serves as the commander.  Colonel  Eric B. Dennis is the depot's commander.

Capabilities
Capabilities of the depot include:  engineering; explosives performance testing; logistical support; machining, fabrication, assembly, repair; robotics; non-destructive testing; demilitarization; laser cutting; and Slurry Emulsion Manufacturing Facility.

History
Built in 1942, TEAD was originally called the Tooele Ordnance Depot and was a storage depot for war supplies. In 1988, TEAD acquired the general supply storage mission from Pueblo Army Depot. In 1955 Tooele Army Depot took over the rail equipment repair shop at Hill Air Force Base near Roy, Utah; and the site operated as a satellite of TEAD until 1994. In BRAC 1993, it lost its troop support mission, maintenance and storage missions. TEAD retained its ammunition logistics support function.

Facilities

BRAC 2005
TEAD will gain the ammunition storage function from Sierra Army Depot, which will be realigning due to Base Realignment and Closure 2005.

Environment
TEAD was placed on the Environmental Protection Agency’s National Priority List (Superfund) in 1990.

In 2009, the Tooele Army Depot was awarded the 31st Annual Secretary of the Army Energy and Water Management Award and the 2009 Federal Energy and Water Management Award. This was based on conservation efforts which saved TEAD more than $60,000 and nearly 100 million gallons of water per year.

See also
Deseret Chemical Depot
Deseret Test Center
Dugway Proving Ground
Tooele Chemical Agent Disposal Facility
Umatilla Chemical Depot
Kambarka
Porton Down
Edgewood Chemical Activity
Dzerzhinsk, Russia
Pine Bluff Arsenal

References

External links
Tooele Army Depot website
Joint Munitions Command website
Information compiled from 
Pike, John E. Tooele Army Depot (TEAD) Tooele, Utah, accessed November 15, 2008.

United States Army logistics installations
1942 establishments in Utah
Buildings and structures in Tooele County, Utah
Military installations in Utah
Superfund sites in Utah
Military Superfund sites
Historic American Engineering Record in Utah